George Hubert O'Brien (born September 16, 1984 in Bermuda) is a Bermudian cricketer, who played with the Bermudian cricket team in their first ever One Day International when they played Canada on 17 May 2006. O'Brien took two wickets as Bermuda won the game by three wickets under the Duckworth–Lewis method.  Three days later, O'Brien took two more wickets against Zimbabwe.

He has since gone on to represent Bermuda in four ODIs, but has been the subject of some controversy. His contract with the Bermuda Cricket Board was terminated in October due to a lack of motivation and commitment and a poor work ethic.  In July 2010, O'Brien was the victim of a machete attack, which left him with serious injuries.

In August 2019, he was named in Bermuda's squad for the Regional Finals of the 2018–19 ICC T20 World Cup Americas Qualifier tournament. In September 2019, he was named in Bermuda's squad for the 2019 ICC T20 World Cup Qualifier tournament in the United Arab Emirates.

References

External links
 
 Statistical summary from CricketArchive
 Article about O'Brien's contract termination

1984 births
Living people
Bermudian cricketers
Bermuda One Day International cricketers
Bermuda Twenty20 International cricketers